The wildlife of Algeria is composed of its flora and fauna. Mountains, chotts, wetlands and grassy desert-like regions all support a wide range of wildlife. The most commonly seen animals include the wild boars, jackals, and gazelles, although it is not uncommon to spot fennecs and jerboas. Leopards and cheetahs are seldom seen.

A variety of bird species make the country an attraction for bird watchers. Barbary macaques are the sole native monkey.

Flora

In the north, the native flora includes the Algerian oak, Atlas cedar, and other conifers. The grape vine is indigenous to the coast. In the Sahara region, some oases have date palms. Acacia with wild olives are the predominant flora in the remainder of the Sahara.

Fauna

Mammals

There are 104 mammal species in Algeria, of which three are critically endangered, two are endangered, ten are vulnerable, and three are near-threatened. One of the species listed for Algeria is extinct and one can no longer be found in the wild.

Atlantic spotted dolphin
Caracal
Common dolphin
Rough-toothed dolphin
Orca
Pilot whale
Pygmy killer whale

Birds

North African ostrich
Guinea fowl
Egyptian vulture
Golden eagle
Bonelli's eagle
Griffon vulture
Loons
Grebes
Great crested grebe
Little grebe
European turtle dove
Shearwaters
Black stork
White stork
Petrels
Storm-petrels
Pelicans
Gannets
Cormorant
Bitterns
Herons
Egrets
Storks
Ibises
Spoonbills
Flamingos
Ducks
Geese
Swans
Osprey
Hawks
Kites
Eagles
Caracaras
Falcon
Pheasant
Partridge
Buttonquail
Crane
Rails
Crakes
Coots
Arabian bustard
Oystercatchers
Avocet
Stilt
Thick-knee
Pratincole
Courser
Plover
Lapwing
Sandpiper
Skuas
Jaegers
Gulls
Terns
Auks
Murres
Puffins
Sandgrouse
Pigeons
Doves
Cuckoos
Great spotted woodpecker
Eurasian wryneck
Ani
Barn owls
Typical owls
Nightjars
Swifts
Kingfishers
Bee-eaters
Starling

Reptiles

Algerian sand racer
Bedriaga's fringe-fingered lizard
Desert monitor
Mediterranean chameleon
Mediterranean house gecko
Moorish gecko
Iberian wall lizard
Red-tailed spiny-footed lizard
Saharan spiny-tailed lizard
Two-fingered skink
Small three-toed skink
Small-spotted lizard
Egyptian sand boa
Muller's sand boa
Boomslang
Egyptian cobra
Erycinae
False smooth snake
Southern smooth snake
Horned desert viper
Lataste's viper
Sahara sand viper
Saw-scaled viper
Viperine water snake
Greek tortoise
European pond terrapin
Leatherback turtle
Loggerhead sea turtle
Nile crocodile (extinct in the wild)

Amphibians

Brongersma's toad
Common toad
European green toad
Mediterranean tree frog
Perez's frog
Sahara frog
Algerian ribbed newt
Edough ribbed newt
North African fire salamander

Fish

Atlantic bluefin tuna
Atlantic blue marlin
Atlantic white marlin
European eel
Angular roughshark
Basking shark
Bignose shark
Blacktip shark
Blacktip reef shark
Bluntnose sixgill shark
Bramble shark
Dusky shark
Great hammerhead
Great white shark
Grey nurse shark
Gulper shark
Kitefin shark
Porbeagle
Sandbar shark
Scalloped hammerhead
Sharpnose sevengill shark
Shortfin mako
Spinner shark
Velvet belly lantern shark

Insects

Acilius duvergeri
Calopteryx exul
Chalepoxenus brunneus
Desert locust
Epimyrma africana
Epimyrma algeriana
Honey bee
Monomorium noualhieri
Onychogomphus costae
Pharaoh ant
Red locust
Strongylognathus afer
Strongylognathus foreli

Other invertebrates

Brine shrimp
Common octopus
Fat-tailed scorpion

References

Biota of Algeria
Algeria